The 2021 Autotrader EchoPark Automotive 500 was a NASCAR Cup Series race held on October 17, 2021, at Texas Motor Speedway in Fort Worth, Texas. Contested over 334 laps on the 1.5 mile (2.4 km) intermediate quad-oval, it was the 33rd race of the 2021 NASCAR Cup Series season, the seventh race of the Playoffs, and first race of the Round of 8.

Report

Background

Texas Motor Speedway is a speedway located in the northernmost portion of the U.S. city of Fort Worth, Texas – the portion located in Denton County, Texas. The track measures  around and is banked 24 degrees in the turns, and is of the oval design, where the front straightaway juts outward slightly. The track layout is similar to Atlanta Motor Speedway and Charlotte Motor Speedway (formerly Lowe's Motor Speedway). The track is owned by Speedway Motorsports, Inc., the same company that owns Atlanta and Charlotte Motor Speedway, as well as the short-track Bristol Motor Speedway.

Entry list
 (R) denotes rookie driver.
 (i) denotes driver who are ineligible for series driver points.

Qualifying
Kyle Larson was awarded the pole for the race as determined by competition-based formula.

Starting Lineup

Race

Kyle Larson was the pole sitter for the race. 30 laps into the race, a crash occurred off turn 2 taking out a number of competitors. Kyle Busch won Stage 1 and Larson won Stage 2. Multiple playoff drivers suffered issues late in the race, with Joey Logano blowing an engine and Denny Hamlin and Martin Truex Jr. involved in wrecks. Larson would lead 257 of the 334 laps to win his eighth race of the season and be the first to advance into the Championship 4.

Stage Results

Stage One
Laps: 105

Stage Two
Laps: 105

Final Stage Results

Stage Three
Laps: 124

Race statistics
 Lead changes: 8 among 5 different drivers
 Cautions/Laps: 11 for 55
 Red flags: 1 for 11 minutes and 9 seconds
 Time of race: 3 hours, 42 minutes and 54 seconds
 Average speed:

Media

Television
NBC Sports covered the race on the television side. Rick Allen, Two–time Texas winner Jeff Burton, Steve Letarte and 2000 Texas winner Dale Earnhardt Jr. called the race from the broadcast booth. Parker Kligerman, Marty Snider and Kelli Stavast handled the pit road duties from pit lane.

Radio
PRN covered their final 2021 broadcast, which was also simulcast on Sirius XM NASCAR Radio. Doug Rice & Mark Garrow covered the action for PRN when the field raced down the front straightaway. Nick Yeoman covered the action for PRN from a platform outside of Turns 1 & 2, & Pat Patterson covered the action from a platform outside of Turns 3 & 4 for PRN. Brad Gillie, Brett McMillan and Heather DeBeaux had the call from pit lane for PRN.

Standings after the race

Drivers' Championship standings

Manufacturers' Championship standings

Note: Only the first 16 positions are included for the driver standings.

References

Autotrader EchoPark Automotive 500
Autotrader EchoPark Automotive 500
NASCAR races at Texas Motor Speedway
Autotrader EchoPark Automotive 500